The University of Wales Act 1902 (2 Edw. 7 c. 14) was an Act of Parliament of the Parliament of the United Kingdom, given the royal assent on 22 July 1902.

It provided that if any office was stipulated as being open to graduates of the universities of Oxford, Cambridge, London, or the Victoria University, or any legal exemption was provided to graduates of those universities, then these privileges would likewise extend to the graduates of the University of Wales holding equivalent degrees.

The Act was repealed by the Statute Law (Repeals) Act 1998

References
The Public General Acts Passed in the Second Year of the Reign of His Majesty King Edward the Seventh. London: printed for His Majesty's Stationery Office. 1902.
Chronological table of the statutes; HMSO, London. 1993.

External links

United Kingdom Acts of Parliament 1902
Repealed United Kingdom Acts of Parliament
1902 in Wales
Acts of the Parliament of the United Kingdom concerning Wales
University-related legislation
1902 in education